The International Order of Freemasonry Le Droit Humain  is a global Masonic Order, membership of which is available to men and women on equal terms, regardless of nationality, religion or ethnicity.

History 

The Order is founded on the ancient teachings and traditions of Freemasonry, using Masonic ritual and symbolism as its tools in the search for truth. On the individual level, the Order aims "to promote the progress of individual worth, without the imposition of dogma, or exacting the abandonment of cultural or religious ideas".  On a collective level it works "to unite men and women who agree on a humanist spirituality whilst respecting individual and cultural differences".

In contrast with other Masonic organisations which operate in national or state jurisdiction only, Le Droit Humain is a global fraternity with many Federations and Jurisdictions worldwide, each of which work the Scottish Rite from the 1st to the 33rd degree. The Order is administered by the Supreme Council, which has its headquarters in Paris.  Within the International Constitution, however, member Federations have the freedom of self-governance.

Le Droit Humain has about 32,000 members in more than 60 countries around the world and on all inhabited continents. Its headquarters is in Paris, France, where it was founded in 1893 by Georges Martin and Maria Deraismes.

Belgium 
The Belgian Federation of Le Droit Humain (French: la Fédération Belge du Droit Humain; Dutch: Belgische Federatie van Le Droit Humain) is a Belgian cupola of masonic lodges which is accessible for men and women, and works in the 33 symbolic degrees of freemasonry. The first Belgian Lodge of Le Droit Humain was founded in 1912.

Great Britain 
The British Federation of the International Order of Co-Freemasonry Le Droit Humain was the first Federation to be established outside France, thus making the Order truly International.  On 26 September 1902 Lodge Human Duty No. 6 was consecrated by the Grand Master, The V. Ills. S. Marie Martin 33°, assisted by Officers of the Supreme Council, including one of the co-founders of the Order, Georges Martin 33°.  The first Master of the Lodge was Annie Besant, who would become the first Grand Commander of the British Federation.

The British Federation works the Ancient & Accepted Scottish Rite from the 1st to the 33rd degree inclusive.  In addition the Allied Degrees of Mark, Royal Ark Mariner, Excellent Master, Holy Royal Arch of Jerusalem, Knights Templar and Royal Order of Scotland are worked.

Portugal 
The Portuguese Federation of Le Droit Humain (Portuguese: Ordem Maçónica Mista Internacional Le Droit Humain - Federação Portuguesa) was founded in 1923 by Adelaide Cabete. After the coup d'état of 28 May 1926 the dictatorial regime Estado Novo forbade masonry in the country and the order fades away. In 1980 a new lodge is opened and a new era for the Portuguese Federation of Le Droit Humain began.

North America
Le Droit Humain is present in Canada, Mexico, and the United States of America. The first lodge in the United States was founded on October 25, 1903, by Louis Goaziou.

Regularity and recognition
Le Droit Humain is in mutual amity with the following Orders (meaning recognition is reciprocal and members can intervisit):
 Grand Loge Féminine de France
 Grand Orient de France
 Grand Orient of Belgium

See also
 Women and Freemasonry
 Co-Freemasonry
 Belgian Federation of Le Droit Humain
 Le Droit Humain in Sweden
 Le Droit Humain in North America
 List of Notable Freemasons

References

External links
The International Order of Freemasonry for Men and Women Le Droit Humain
The International Order of Freemasonry for Men and Women Le Droit Humain — French Federation 
The International Order of Freemasonry for Men and Women Le Droit Humain — British Federation
The International Order of Freemasonry for Men and Women Le Droit Humain — American Federation
The International Order of Freemasonry for Men and Women Le Droit Humain — Australian Federation
The International Order of Freemasonry for Men and Women Le Droit Humain — South African Federation

Co-Freemasonry
Freemasonry
Masonic organizations
Grand Lodges